The Brooklyn Camorra or New York Camorra was a loose grouping of early-20th-century organized crime groups that formed among Italian immigrants originating in Naples and the surrounding Campania region living in Greater New York, particularly in Brooklyn. In the early 20th century, the criminal underworld of New York City consisted largely of Italian Harlem-based Sicilians and groups of Neapolitans from Brooklyn, sometimes referred to as the Brooklyn Camorra, as Neapolitan organized crime is referred to as the Camorra. this group had several distinct differences from their more well known counterparts, Namely "different organizational models. While Cosa Nostra (in the past) and ‘Ndrangheta are characterized by a unitary, vertical structure and higher-level coordination bodies, Camorra has a plurality of organizational models; the majority of clans maintain a structure that is fluid, polycentric, and conflictual." This lack of structure makes the Camorra a particularly unique group to study as, "The Camorra is a closed sect that acts in the shadows and does not collect and preserve documents that can later be studied by scholars or researchers. It is hard to rebuild the history of the Camorra: the picture is fragmented, a mix of half-truths and legends."

Background
The substantial population of the New York Italian immigrant community offered plentiful economic opportunities. At the turn of the century, some 500,000 Italians, mainly originating from the impoverished southern regions of Italy, lived in New York City and had to survive in difficult social and economic circumstances. A New York Times article in 1885 mentions the presence of the Camorra in New York, involved in extortion and immigrant and labor racketeering.

The New York Camorra were an offshoot of Italian criminals who once had significant power in the Naples region, but had become weakened by Italy's unification. This unification led to a crackdown on the criminal order and, " the severe sentences that were passed on those convicted dealt a shattering blow to the organization. Many Camorristi fled to the United States, where, according to some sources, they carried on bloody feuds with the Mafia until about 1920, when that organization absorbed the surviving Camorra members."

Italian immigration “made fortunes for speculators and landlords, but it also transformed the neighborhood into a kind of human ant heap in which suffering, crime, ignorance and filth were the dominant elements,” according to historian Arrigo Petacco. According to sociologist Humbert S. Nelli: “New York’s Italian community offered a lucrative market for illicit activities, particularly gambling and prostitution. It also provided a huge market for products from the homeland and from the West Coast, such as artichokes and olive oil, the distribution of which the criminal elements attempted to control.”

However Camorra criminals were not from all across Italy, their roots in the Campania region of the country are one of the key differences between them and the SIcilian Mafia

Early crime bosses

The cheap labor needed for the expansion of capitalism of that time was made available by the scores of poor Italian immigrants. Like earlier immigrant generations, a few Sicilians and Neapolitans engaged in criminal activities to succeed, employing the crime traditions from their original Italian home regions. One of the prominent crime bosses was Enrico Alfano, who became one of the principal underworld targets of police sergeant Joseph Petrosino, the head of the Italian Squad of the New York City Police Department. Another prominent criminal boss around 1910-15 was Giosue Gallucci, the undisputed King of Little Italy born in Naples, who employed Neapolitan and Sicilian street gangs as his enforcers for the Italian lottery or numbers game and enjoyed functional immunity from law enforcement through his political contacts.

These bosses would eventually conspire to have Petrosino killed while investigating, sparking what would become one of the first national crackdowns against the emerging organized crime families.

Apart from them there were different Camorra gangs in New York. The gangs had their roots in the Neapolitan Camorra, but most members were American born. The two New York based Camorra groups were the Neapolitan Navy Street gang headed by Alessandro Vollero and Leopoldo Lauritano, and the Neapolitan Coney Island gang under the command of Pellegrino Morano who ran his activities from his Santa Lucia restaurant in Coney Island.

Vollero and Lauritano owned a coffee house at 133 Navy Street in Brooklyn. The coffee house was used as the headquarters for their gang, which mainly consisted of Neapolitans, and was often referred to as The Camorra. Morano opened the Santa Lucia restaurant close to the Coney Island amusements parks with his right-hand men Tony Parretti, from where his gang made money in gambling and cocaine dealing. The gangs were not tightly led organizations, but rather loose associations where everybody worked for himself, although Morano was one of the leaders that initiated recruits as camorristi.

Both gangs initially worked together against the Morello crime family from Italian Harlem for control of the New York rackets. The Camorra groups tried to muscle in the lucrative artichoke business, but the wholesale dealers resisted their threats. In the end, a deal was negotiated in which a ‘tax’ of 25 dollars was levied on every car load of artichokes delivered, under threat of stealing the dealer's horses or wrecking their merchandise. Coal and ice merchants also proved hard to extort, and the business gains of the groups were not as large as they expected. Eventually, they were decimated when their own members turned against them.

By 1931 a  man by the name of Reynolds Forsbrey is credited in print by The New York Times as being the last Navy Street Gang member, known for a plethora of Daring prison breaks This further highlights the demise of the gang by the mid nineteen hundreds

Mafia-Camorra War

The fight over the control of the New York rackets is known as the Mafia–Camorra War and started after the killing of Giosue Gallucci and his son on May 17, 1915. This murder immediately heightened tensions between the once amicable groups, in the past 'Before this conflict started, relations between the two sides were relatively amicable; in fact, each year the Morellos would attend a ‘smoker’ held by Camorra boss Ricci in Brooklyn. However, things were soon to change." The violence and string of murders prompted a reaction from the authorities. Police convinced Ralph Daniello to testify against his former associates of the Brooklyn Navy Street gang. He provided evidence about 23 murders. Several Grand Juries issued 21 indictments in November 1917. At the trials, some criminals involved depicted the Navy Street and Coney Island gangs as "Camorra" and used "Mafia" to identify the groups from East Harlem. The results of the trials were terrible for many high ranking officials of the Camorra including Vollero who was in jail for murder by 1919 according to the New York times.

The difference in Name was not the only thing that separated Camorra families from their Mafia counterparts, "Compared to other mafias, the Camorra has always been considered less dangerous because it is more visible, territorial, and amateurish. However, when camorristi move abroad, they become less attached to a specific territory and focus purely on economic activities. They do not migrate as clans but as individuals who manage to “camouflage” themselves so efficiently that it becomes difficult to recognize them as a threat to foreign societies and economies. However these subtle differences did not help Camorra in their struggles with more organized families. In fact the lack of organization for the Camorra was a detriment.

This lack of organization was a major reason that so many Camorra members flipped in the trial, as the Camorra did not have the same code of loyalty as the Mafia. This conflict was important because not only did it effectivley eliminate the Camorra as an entity, but additionally it was the first example of a Mob war in recorded history, and set the ground rules for the criminal conflicts that would arise throughout Prohibition.

The trials in 1918 entirely dismantled the Navy Street gang. Testimonies of their own associates destroyed the internal protection against law enforcement they once enjoyed. The demise of the gangs meant the end of the Camorra in New York and the rise in power of their rivals, the American-based Sicilian Mafia groups. 
Following the downfall of the New York Camorra, Neapolitan or Campanian organized crime groups in New York were absorbed into or merged with the newly dominant Sicilian Mafia groups in New York, creating the modern Italian-American Mafia, which would increasingly consist of not only Sicilians but Italian and Italian-American criminals from various Italian regions. Future Italian-American gangsters that originated from Naples or Campania, like Vito Genovese, operated in Italian-American Mafia families, in which an Italian-American gangster's exact Italian region of origin had little importance as long as he was of Italian origin.

References

Sources
Abadinsky, Howard (2010). Organized Crime (Ninth Edition), Belmont (CA): Wadsworth, 
Critchley, David (2009). The Origin of Organized Crime in America: The New York City Mafia, 1891-1931, New York: Routledge, 
Dash, Mike (2009). The First Family: Terror, Extortion, Revenge, Murder, and the Birth of the American Mafia, New York: Random House, 
Nelli, Humbert S. (1981). The Business of Crime. Italians and Syndicate Crime in the United States, Chicago: The University of Chicago Press  (Originally published in 1976)
Romano, Anne T. (2010). Italian Americans in Law Enforcement, Xlibris Corporation, 

Mafia-Camorra war
Former gangs in New York City
Italian-American organized crime groups
New York City